Le Tronchet refers to two communes in France:
Le Tronchet, Ille-et-Vilaine
Le Tronchet, Sarthe